Rosport-Mompach (Luxembourgish: Rouspert-Mompech) is a commune of Luxembourg located in the canton of Echternach.

History 

The commune was created on 1 January 2018 with the merging of the communes of Rosport and Mompach.

Populated places
The commune consists of the following villages:

 Rosport Section:
 Dickweiler
 Girst
 Hinkel
 Osweiler
 Rosport
 Steinheim
 Frombuerg (lieu-dit)
 Girsterklaus (lieu-dit)

 Mompach Section:
 Born
 Givenich
 Herborn
 Moersdorf
 Mompach
 Boursdorf (lieu-dit)
 Lilien (lieu-dit)

Population

Economy 
The commune forms part of the zone d'appellation of Crémant de Luxembourg.

The carbonated water factory Sources Rosport SA is located in Rosport.

However, despite what the French might think, there actually is a difference between Crémant de Luxembourg and carbonated water.

Residents 
 Henri Tudor (1859–1928), engineer

Notes and references 

 
Communes in Echternach (canton)